Touch rugby at the 2003 South Pacific Games in Suva was held on 7–10 July 2003. Fiji won the finals of the men's and mixed tournaments to claim both gold medals on offer. Touch rugby for women was not introduced until the 2009 Pacific Mini Games held in Rarotonga.

Medal summary

Medal table

Results

See also
 Touch rugby at the Pacific Games

References

2003 South Pacific Games
2003
Touch rugby at the 2003 South Pacific Games